The United Andhra Pradesh Legislative Assembly election of 1994 took place in December 1994 in 294 constituencies in United Andhra Pradesh, India. The elections were conducted to elect the government in the state of Andhra Pradesh for the next five years. The TDP secured a huge majority winning 226 seats. The Indian National Congress won only 26 seats.  
NTR was sworn his 3rd term as Chief Minister of the state.

In Andhra Pradesh, the Vidhan Sabha, or Legislative Assembly, has 294  constituencies. 39
constituencies are reserved for the Scheduled Castes candidates and 15 constituencies are reserved for the Scheduled tribes candidates.

Results

Elected members

Government formation

References

State Assembly elections in Andhra Pradesh
1990s in Andhra Pradesh
Andhra